Slashmusic was a podcast presented by Tom Ravenscroft for Channel 4 Radio. Forty shows were made available between August 2006 and June 2007.  The show was produced by Hermeet Chadhar, who had formerly produced a Radio 1 show for John Peel, Ravenscroft's father.  The podcast was relaunched in January 2008 under the name New Music Download.

The show was originally a 30-minute podcast, and was later extended to 45 minutes due to demand from listeners (although the show often extended to around an hour in length).

Music

Channel 4 Unsigned
The show was intended to showcase music from the Channel 4 Unsigned music pages (from which the show took its name, i.e. www.channel4.com/music), but the time was often filled with tracks taken from other sources.  Ravenscroft said of the Unsigned pages, Despite my initial apprehensions of what I would find on Channel 4's MyMusic website, the job of trawling through its 20,000 tracks has proved hugely entertaining and we found some brilliant music.

Sessions
The show also featured sessions especially recorded for the show:

Show 11 was a series of live performances recorded in Manchester, and featured The Fourers, Cutting Pink With Knives, Suzy Mangion, 65daysofstatic and Hotplate.

Show 36 was recorded in Berlin and featured specially recorded tracks by Milenasong and Malta.

Notes and references

External links
Slashmusic at Channel 4 Radio
New Music Download at Channel 4 Radio
New Music Download at MySpace – formerly the Slashmusic Myspace page.
Channel 4 Unsigned at Channel 4 Radio 
Slashmusic Track listings – Unofficial site with track listings up to Episode 26.

British music radio programmes